Jimmy Hanley (22 October 1918 – 13 January 1970) was an English actor who appeared in the popular Huggetts film series, and in ITV's most popular advertising magazine programme, Jim's Inn, from 1957 to 1963.

Early life
Born in Norwich, Norfolk, Hanley began his career as a child actor before becoming popular in juvenile roles. He was groomed by the Rank Studio system during his teenage years and earned film stardom as a "boy-next-door" type. The young actor attended the Italia Conti Academy of Theatre Arts and whilst he was studying there, made his stage debut at age 12 at the London Palladium, as John Darling in Peter Pan. He began to make films in his teens.

Career
During the Second World War he served as an officer with the King's Own Yorkshire Light Infantry, and in a commando raid in Norway he was wounded in the leg and was invalided out of the service. He returned to films, including Salute John Citizen (1942), Henry V with Laurence Olivier (1944), For You Alone (1945) and the Huggetts films. He later worked on radio and TV, appearing in several television series and hosting the ITV series Jim's Inn from 1957 to 1963, which combined advertising messages with the plot of a soap opera, where he and his wife Maggie played the hosts of a pub where customers discussed bargains and new products whilst drinking. The series finished when advertising magazine programmes were banned.

Personal life
Hanley was married twice:
 Dinah Sheridan 1942–1952 three children, including Jenny Hanley and the Conservative politician Sir Jeremy Hanley. The third died in infancy.
 Margaret Avery (1955–1970, three daughters: Jane, Sarah and Katy)

Hanley died from pancreatic cancer in Fetcham, Surrey, on 13 January 1970, at the age of 51.

Selected filmography

 Red Wagon (1933) - Young Joe Prince
 Those Were the Days (1933) - Boy with bicycle (uncredited)
 Little Friend (1934) - Leonard Parry
 Wild Boy (1934) - Boy With Message (uncredited)
 Royal Cavalcade (1935) - Newsboy
 Boys Will Be Boys (1935) - Cyril Brown
 Brown on Resolution (1935) - Ginger
 The Tunnel (1935) - Geoffrey McAllan
 Landslide (1937) - Jimmy Haddon
 Cotton Queen (1937) - Jack Owen (uncredited)
 Night Ride (1937) - Dick Benson
 Housemaster (1938) - Travers
 Coming of Age (1938) - Arthur Strudwick
 There Ain't No Justice (1939) - Tommy Mutch
 Gaslight (1940) - Cobb
 Salute John Citizen (1942) - Ernest Bunting
 The Gentle Sex (1943) - 1st Soldier
 The Way Ahead (1944) - Pte. Geoffrey Stainer
 Henry V (1944) - Williams - Soldier in the English Army
 Kiss the Bride Goodbye (1945) - Jack Fowler
 29 Acacia Avenue (1945) - Peter Robinson
 For You Alone (1945) - Dennis Britton
 Murder in Reverse? (1945) - Peter Rogers
 The Captive Heart (1946) - Pte. Mathews
 Holiday Camp (1947) - Jimmy Gardner
 Master of Bankdam (1947) - Simeon Crowther Jr.
 It Always Rains on Sunday (1947) - Whitey
 Nothing Venture (1948) - Introduction to serial version
 It's Hard to Be Good (1947) - Captain James Gladstone Wedge VC
 Here Come the Huggetts (1948) - Jimmy Gardner
 The Huggetts Abroad (1949) - Jimmy Gardner
 Don't Ever Leave Me (1949) - Jack Denton
 Boys in Brown (1949) - Bill Foster
 The Blue Lamp (1950) - PC Andy Mitchell
 Room to Let (1950) - Curly Minter
 The Galloping Major (1951) - Bill Collins, Bus Driver
 Radio Cab Murder (1954) - Fred Martin
 The Black Rider (1954) - Jerry Marsh
 The Deep Blue Sea (1955) - Dicer Durston
 Satellite in the Sky (1956) - Larry
 The Lost Continent (1968) - Patrick, the Bartender

Television series
 Jim's Inn (1957–1963, ITV advertising programme) - host
 Five O'Clock Club (1963–1966, ITV children's programme) - host
 Futurama (1964, ITV children's science programme) - host
 Crossroads (1966, ITV soap) - Jimmy Gudgeon, old friend of central character Meg Richardson (played by Noele Gordon)

References

External links
 
 
 

1918 births
1970 deaths
King's Own Yorkshire Light Infantry officers
20th-century English male actors
English male stage actors
English male film actors
English male television actors
British Army personnel of World War II
British Army Commandos officers
Deaths from pancreatic cancer
Deaths from cancer in England
Military personnel from Norwich